Kakching Legislative Assembly constituency is one of the 60 Legislative Assembly constituencies of Manipur state in India.

It is part of Thoubal district.

Members of the Legislative Assembly

Election results

2017 
Yengkhom Surchandra Singh was declared the winner of the election in 2017, but the second place candidate, M. Rameshwar Singh challenged his victory in the courts, citing non-divulgence of assets. The case was declared in favor of the plaintiff by the Sikkim High Court and M. Rameshwar Singh was declared to be the new MLA of Kakching.

See also
 List of constituencies of the Manipur Legislative Assembly
 Thoubal district

References

External links
 

Thoubal district
Assembly constituencies of Manipur